Michael D. Wilcher (born March 20, 1960) is a former NFL linebacker. He is a graduate from the University of North Carolina who played pro football from 1983–1991 for the Los Angeles Rams and San Diego Chargers.
He played his high school football at Eastern High School, a powerhouse in Washington DC.

At the University of North Carolina, Wilcher replaced Lawrence Taylor in the Tar Heel lineup, recording 68 tackles his senior season. He had 20 tackles for loss in his final two seasons combined. He was drafted in the second round (36th overall pick) of the 1983 NFL Draft. He was noted for good size (6-3, 240 pounds) and speed (4.73 forty-yard time).

With the Los Angeles Rams he spent his first year-and-a-half playing special teams and backing up outside linebackers Mel Owens and George Andrews. When Andrews suffered a knee injury in 1984, Wilcher took over the right outside linebacker position and held it though 1990. He started the final 5 games of 1984 and recorded 2 sacks. In 1985 Wilcher led the Rams with 12.5 sacks and recording 97 tackles. He ended his Rams career with 400 tackles, 38.5 sacks and 4 interceptions. He finished his NFL career playing two games with the San Diego Chargers, making his career total 125 games. He now lives in Maryland with his wife and three kids

1960 births
Living people
American football linebackers
North Carolina Tar Heels football players
Los Angeles Rams players
San Diego Chargers players
Players of American football from Washington, D.C.
African-American players of American football
21st-century African-American people
20th-century African-American sportspeople
Eastern High School (Washington, D.C.) alumni